This is a list of wars involving Benin or its predecessors.

List

References 

 
Benin
Wars
Wars